Régina is a commune of French Guiana, an overseas region and department of France located in South America. The town is named after the first merchant who settled in the area.

Overview
Régina lies on the Approuague River. In former times it was a gold mining centre. During the 1870s, it was home to several thousand people. 

Guisanbourg was founded in April 1832 as the administrative centre. After the discovery gold, Régina became more important. In 1936, Régina became the capital of the commune. In the 1980s, Guisanbourg became a ghost town.

Villages
Guisanbourg, former capital of the commune, and ghost town.
Kaw

Transport
Following the construction of a bridge over the Approuague River in 2003, an asphalted road from Régina to Saint-Georges de l'Oyapock (a town by the Brazilian border) was opened in 2004, completing the road from Cayenne (the préfecture and largest city of French Guiana) to the Brazilian border. It is now possible to drive on a fully paved road from Saint-Laurent-du-Maroni on the Surinamese border to Oiapoque, Brazil.

Nature
The Nouragues Nature Reserve is located near the town. The reserve was created in 1996, and covers 76,000 hectares.

In 1998, the Kaw-Roura Marshland Nature Reserve was established, and covers an area of 94,700 hectares between Roura and Régina, and is sometimes nicknamed "the Everglades of Guyana".

The Petite Montagnes Tortue Biological Reserve is located the commune. It is mountain range of quartz mountains which are home to many rare or endemic plants.

Climate
Régina has a tropical rainforest climate (Köppen Af) with heavy to very heavy rainfall year-round.

See also
Communes of French Guiana
Îles du Connétable

References

External links
 Régina at Annuaire Mairie (in French)

Communes of French Guiana